Land Art Mongolia (LAM 360°) is a biennial art festival in Mongolia.

History 
Land Art Mongolia was launched in 2006 in tandem with a Land Art Symposium in Bor-Öndör. Artists from 16 countries participated.

The Land Art Mongolia event was presented during the opening of the 56th Venice Biennale.

The 2021 edition was split into two events: urban public art and land art.

Organizer 
MNG 360° (MNG 360° БАЙГАЛИЙН УРЛАГ МОНГОЛ) is an Ulaanbaatar based independent arts organization dedicated to raising awareness of issues such as sustainability, nomadic culture, ecological decentralization and democracy through contemporary art. Their main project is this biennial, which takes places throughout the Mongolian steppe and offers residency and an exhibit space to artists working in these fields. Marc Schmitz is the founder of the Land Art Mongolia Biennial and has served as artistic director since 2010.  Marc Schmitz has been married to artist Dolgor Ser-Od since 2008.

Editions

References

External links 
landartmongolia.com 

Exhibitions
Art biennials
Land art
Conferences
2006 establishments in Mongolia
Art exhibitions in Mongolia